The 1931–32 Irish Cup was the 52nd edition of the premier knock-out cup competition in Northern Irish football. 

Glentoran won the tournament for the 4th time, defeating Linfield 2–1 in the final at Celtic Park.

Results

First round

|}

Replay

|}

Second replay

|}

Quarter-finals

|}

Replay

|}

Semi-finals

|}

Replay

|}

Second replay

|}

Final

References

External links
 Northern Ireland Cup Finals. Rec.Sport.Soccer Statistics Foundation (RSSSF)

Irish Cup seasons
1931–32 domestic association football cups
1931–32 in Northern Ireland association football